(KUISs) is a private university in Miki, Hyōgo, Japan. The school was first established as a junior women's college in 1987. In 1998 it became a co-ed four-year college. It opened a campus in Amagasaki city between Kobe and Osaka in 2009.

External links

 Official website 
 Official website 

List of universities in Japan

Educational institutions established in 1987
Educational institutions disestablished in 2021
Private universities and colleges in Japan
Universities and colleges in Hyōgo Prefecture
1987 establishments in Japan
2021 disestablishments in Japan
Miki, Hyōgo